The Caledonian Park Clock Tower, Islington, London is the major remaining element of the Metropolitan Cattle Market, opened in 1855 by the City of London Corporation as a replacement for the market at Smithfield. The complex was designed by the Corporation's Surveyor, James Bunstone Bunning, and was laid out on a site of  that originally formed the estate of a mansion, Copenhagen House. The market consisted of the central clock tower, enclosures for animals, slaughterhouses, sales arenas, administrative offices and four public houses, one standing at each corner of the complex. The cattle market was closed in the 1930s, and the meat market in the 1960s, with much of the site being redeveloped for council housing. The clock tower, two stretches of railings and three of the four pubs are all that now remain. After suffering neglect and vandalism in the late 20th century, the clock tower was restored between 2016–2019 and is now open to the public. It is a Grade II* listed building, the railings and pubs having separate Grade II listings.

History

The market at Smithfield in the City of London has been in operation for over 800 years. By the mid-Victorian era, the development of London had made the transportation of livestock into the centre of the city problematic and in 1852 the Smithfield Market Removal Act was passed, allowing for the construction of a new Metropolitan Cattle Market on the site of a demolished mansion, Copenhagen House, in Islington, to the north of the city. The market complex was designed by the Corporation of London's Surveyor, James Bunstone Bunning, and was opened by Prince Albert on 15 June 1855. The rectangular site radiated out from the central clock tower and comprised livestock pens that could accommodate 12,700 cattle, sheep and pigs, slaughterhouses, sales arenas, offices, banks, a telegraph office and two hostels and five pubs for the rest and recreation of the drovers who brought the animals into London, and for the market workers.

The sale of livestock at the site ended in the 1930s, and of meat in the 1960s. The market buildings were then mostly demolished, council housing, principally the Market Estate, was built over much of the site, and the remainder converted to a municipal park. In the late 20th century, the tower suffered considerably from vandalism. In 2016, Islington Council began a restoration project at a cost of just under £2M which saw the reopening on the clock tower in 2019. The tower now offers public access and guided tours.

Architecture and description
The tower stands 46m high, designed to act as a focal point for drovers entering London. It has five storeys and is constructed of Portland stone. The base is rusticated and is supported by "swooping buttresses" on each side. The clock set into the fourth storey is by the firm of John Morris of Clerkenwell and has a set of three bells which rang each day to signal the market's opening and closing. The final storey has a balustrade giving good views over London, and is topped with a weather vane in the form of a dragon which was re-gilded during the restoration in 2016-2019. Bridget Cherry, in her revised London 4: North edition of the Pevsner Buildings of England, describes the Caledonian Park Clock Tower as "magnificent; Italianate with Baroque buttreses and a more conventional Quattrocento top". The tower is a Grade II* listed building. Two sets of railings which once fully enclosed the market are listed Grade II. Only three of the four public houses which originally stood at each corner of the market site remain, The White Horse, The Lamb, and The Lion, each of which is also listed Grade II. The fourth, The Black Bull, which stood at the south-west corner has been demolished.

Footnotes

References

Sources

External links
 Illustrated article on the tower's restoration by the contracting architects

Buildings and structures in the London Borough of Islington
Grade II* listed buildings in the London Borough of Islington